Railway City Transit includes both conventional city transit buses and paratransit vehicles owned by the City of St. Thomas, Ontario and staffed and operated by Voyageur Transportation, who took over the service from Aboutown Transportation on January 1, 2012.

Private companies have provided a variety of transportation services to the city since the introduction of horse-drawn street railways in 1879, which were subsequently electrified and ultimately replaced by buses about 1927. Although the city assumed responsibility for transit in the mid-1960s, these bus services have always been privately operated.

The Transit Operational Centre is located downtown at 614 Talbot Street. The stop for Aboutown's Northlink intercity bus service to London and Owen Sound has been relocated to Factory Muffler, 210 Talbot Street. The Northlink service to London was cancelled December 2013.

In November 2020, the City announced a new revitalized brand and suite of services for the 150-year-old public transit service. On March 29, 2021, the new service was launched, replacing the former St. Thomas Transit system.

History

Mid 1960's-1983 - Operated by Charterways Transportation.
1983-? - Operated by Lewis Bus Lines.
?-1994-? - Operated by Charterways Transportation.
2008?-January 2012 - Operated by Aboutown Transportation.
January 2012-March 2021 - Operated by Voyago Transportation.
March 29, 2021 - System rebranded to Local Motion - Railway City Transit.

Routes

Conventional Service Hours: Weekdays from 7:15 am to 5:45 pm, weekends from 9:15 am to 6:45 pm.

Afterhours On-Demand Service Hours: Monday to Friday: 7:15 am - 9:45 pm, Saturday: 9:15 am - 9:45 pm, Sunday: 9:15 am - 5:45 pm

1 - Northside
2 - Elgin Mall
3 - Talbot
4 - Hospital
5 - Fanshawe

See also

 Public transport in Canada

References

External links
 Routes and Maps
 St. Thomas Transit: Full System Ride Guide
 Voyageur Transportation

Transit agencies in Ontario
Transport in St. Thomas, Ontario